The Curling Store Cashspiel is an annual bonspiel, or curling tournament, held at the Lakeshore Curling Club in Lower Sackville, Nova Scotia. It has been an on and off event of the Men's and Women's World Curling Tour since 2004 under many different names. The tournament is held in a round robin format. In 2004, it was held as an open event to both men's and women's teams.

Previous names
2004: Lakeshore Curling Club Cashspiel
2014: Gibson's Cashspiel
2015: Appelton Rum Cashspiel
2016–2017: Lakeshore Curling Club Cashspiel
2018–present: The Curling Store Cashspiel

Past Champions

Men

Women

Open

References

World Curling Tour events
Women's World Curling Tour events
Curling competitions in Halifax, Nova Scotia
2004 establishments in Nova Scotia